Dzaoudzi–Pamandzi International Airport  is an airport located in Dzaoudzi, Mayotte, France on the southern tip of the island of Petite-Terre (or Pamanzi), located east of Grande-Terre, the main island of Mayotte. It is the only airport in Mayotte with scheduled services, mainly to destinations within Africa and to metropolitan France. The airport services aircraft up to the Boeing 777 in size.

A new runway (15/33) to the west of the current runway is being planned and will be 2,600 metres in length to accommodate larger aircraft, such as the Airbus A380 and Boeing 747 in size. Once built the older runway will become a taxiway. There are also plans for a new terminal to be built (and likely replace the current departure and arrival buildings). This project will be completed by 2015.

The headquarters of Ewa Air are on the airport property.

Airlines and destinations

Statistics

Facilities
The airport is open from 5 am to 5:30 pm local time.

The airport consists of a cluster of several small buildings:

 two-story departure terminal building
 arrivals terminal
 control tower
 freight hangar

The airport has its own fleet of modern airport fire tenders (Carmichael Cobra 2 6x6 ARFF).

There are no large hangars or cargo-handling facilities at the airport.

The south tarmac area is reserved for the French military.

Transportation
Travel to and from the airport can be made by car. There is limited parking at the airport, so the preferred travel is by taxi into town (4 km from Dzaoudzi).

See also
 List of airports in Mayotte
 Prince Said Ibrahim International Airport

References

External links
 Mayotte Airport Website
 

Airports in Mayotte
Dzaoudzi